Lake Danao may refer to lakes in the Philippines:

 Lake Danao (Cebu) in the province of Cebu
 Lake Danao (Leyte) in the province of Leyte
 Lake Danao (Negros) in the province of Negros Oriental
 Lake Danao, also called Cabilao Island Lake, on Cabilao Island, Bohol

See also
Danao (disambiguation)
Lake Lanao, Lanao del Sur